Eitanim is a psychiatric hospital in central Israel. Located near Jerusalem, it falls under the jurisdiction of Mateh Yehuda Regional Council.

Etymology
The name of the village is from a verse in the Bible, prophet : "Listen, you enduring foundations of the earth".

History
In 1942 an agricultural school was established in the area (then known as Dayr 'Amr) for Arab orphans of the 1936–1939 Arab revolt in Palestine. In 1950 a hospital for people with tuberculosis was founded on the site.

Today Eitanim is a psychiatric hospital that specializes in acute emergency cases. It operates as a branch of Kfar Shaul and the Jerusalem Mental Health Center. The compound has separate facilities for men and women. Eitanim is the only psychiatric hospital in Israel with an entire ward dedicated to the treatment of severe autism in adults.

Broadcasting station
On Etamin, there is also a broadcasting station with multiple towers. The tallest of them is 110 metres (360 ft) tall and additionally guyed. It is among other used for broadcasting the following radio programmes in the FM-range.

See also
Health care in Israel

References

Villages in Israel
Psychiatric hospitals in Israel
Populated places established in 1950
Hospitals established in 1950
1950 establishments in Israel
Buildings and structures in Jerusalem District